The 1950 All-Ireland Minor Football Championship was the 19th staging of the All-Ireland Minor Football Championship, the Gaelic Athletic Association's premier inter-county Gaelic football tournament for boys under the age of 18.

Armagh entered the championship as defending champions, however, they were defeated by Antrim in the Ulster final.

On 24 September 1950, Kerry won the championship following a 3-6 to 1-4 defeat of Wexford in the All-Ireland final. This was their fifth All-Ireland title overall and their first in four championship seasons.

Results

Connacht Minor Football Championship

Leinster Minor Football Championship

Munster Minor Football Championship

Ulster Minor Football Championship

All-Ireland Minor Football Championship

Semi-finals

Final

References

1950
All-Ireland Minor Football Championship